Cardoza is a surname.

Notable people with this name

Anthony Cardoza (1930–2015), American actor and film producer
Avery Cardoza (born 1957), author and publisher
David Cardoza, English executive
Dennis Cardoza (born 1959), American politician
Mervyn Cardoza (1922-2010), Pakistani Catholic, one-star general in the Pakistan Army
Nora Cardoza (born 1983), Mexican boxer

See also
Cardozo, Spanish or Portuguese surname
Cardoso, surname, modern form of Cardoza